HFK Třebíč is a football club in Třebíč in the Vysočina Region of the Czech Republic. It plays in the Czech Fourth Division. The club reached the third round of the Czech Cup in 2003–04, 2009–10 and 2010–11.

Current squad

References

External links
 Official website 

Football clubs in the Czech Republic
Association football clubs established in 2000
Třebíč